Guido Gillarduzzi (7 October 1939 – 30 April 2016) was an Italian speed skater. He competed in four events at the 1968 Winter Olympics.

References

External links
 

1939 births
2016 deaths
Italian male speed skaters
Olympic speed skaters of Italy
Speed skaters at the 1968 Winter Olympics
People from Cortina d'Ampezzo
Sportspeople from the Province of Belluno